Freetown Sound is the third album by Dev Hynes recording as Blood Orange. It was released on 28 June 2016, three days before its originally announced release date of 1 July 2016. The album contains guest appearances by Empress Of, Debbie Harry, Nelly Furtado, Kelsey Lu and Carly Rae Jepsen. The album cover is a 2009 photograph titled Binky and Tony Forever by American artist Deana Lawson.

Production
Freetown Sound takes its name from Freetown, Sierra Leone, where Hynes' father was born. The album features Carly Rae Jepsen, Zuri Marley, Debbie Harry, Nelly Furtado, writer Ta-Nehisi Coates, slam poet Ashlee Haze, and others. When he first announced the album's release on Instagram, Hynes wrote that the album was intended for those who had been told they were "not black enough, too black, too queer, not queer the right way."

Promotion
The track "Hadron Collider", featuring Nelly Furtado, was released only as a cassette tape on 12 December 2015, and sold exclusively at his shows at the Apollo Theater in New York City.
A music video for "Augustine" was released on 28 June 2016, accompanying the release of the album. A video for "I Know" was released on 28 October 2016, followed by a video for "Better Than Me", featuring Carly Rae Jepsen, on 16 December 2016. On 24 March 2017, a music video/short film for the tracks "With Him", "Best to You", and "Better Numb" was released exclusively on the music streaming service TIDAL. The video also features Empress Of, appearing on behalf of her vocals on "Best to You".

Composition
Freetown Sound has been seen as a "deep" avant-pop work, as well as pulling in funk and 80s R&B sounds. It also works gospel, quiet storm's "subtle bluster", soca and soul into its mix.

Critical reception

The album was released to high critical acclaim and positive reviews. Writing for Exclaim!, Stephen Carlick praised the album, calling it "Hynes at his best, mixing his best songwriting and production yet to powerful, purposeful effect."

The album was shortlisted by IMPALA (The Independent Music Companies Association) for the Album of the Year Award 2016, which rewards on a yearly basis the best album released on an independent European label.

Accolades

Track listing

Sample credits
 "By Ourselves" contains samples from "Myself When I Am Real" written by Charles Mingus and the poem "For Colored Women" by Ashlee Haze.
 "E.V.P" contains samples from "Chief Inspector" written by Wally Badarou from his "Echoes" album.
 "Love Ya" contains samples from an interview with Ta-Nehisi Coates.
 "Desirée" contains samples from the 1990 documentary film Paris Is Burning.
"Hands Up" contains samples from an interview with Vince Staples.
 "Thank You" contains samples from "Stakes Is High" by De La Soul.

Personnel

 Devonte Hynes – vocals , keyboards , piano , bass , drums , synths , drum machine , guitar , cello , drum programming , scratching , percussion , vox , EWI , Juno ; arrangement , vocal arrangements ; production, engineering , mixing ; booklet photos
 Jason Arce – saxophone ; saxophone arrangements 
 Adam Bainbridge – drums, sampling  production ; end arrangement 
 BEA1991 – vocals 
 Mikaelin 'Blue' Bluespruce – additional vocal engineering , mixing 
 Dave Cooley – additional live engineering 
 Matthew Cooper – design
 Bryndon Cook – vocals 
 Christopher Egan – drums 
 David Ginyard – bass 
 Debbie Harry – vocals 
 Nick Harwood – booklet photo
 Nelly Furtado – vocals ; vocal arrangements 
 Ian Isiah – vocals 
 Joseph of Mercury – vocal arrangements 
 John Carroll Kirby – keyboards 
 Caleb Laven – additional engineering 
 Kelsey Lu – vocals ; organisation of tracks idea 
 Aaron Maine – third chord suggestion in hook ; acoustic guitar 
 Benjamin Morsberger – guitar 
 Zuri Marley – vocals 
 Carly Rae Jepsen – vocals 
 Ava Raiin – vocals 
 Miles Benjamin Anthony Robinson – engineering 
 Lorely Rodriguez – vocals 
 Paul J Street – design
 Patrick Wimberly – drums, percussion, bass ; production

Charts

References

2016 albums
Albums produced by Patrick Wimberly
Domino Recording Company albums
Avant-pop albums
Funk albums by English artists
Funk albums by American artists
Contemporary R&B albums by English artists
Contemporary R&B albums by American artists
Dev Hynes albums